Pedro Damián Monzón (born 23 February 1962) is an Argentine football manager and former player who played as a defender. He is the current interim manager of Independiente.

Club career
Moncho Monzón played in different clubs, but most importantly in Independiente, with which he obtained 4 titles, including the Intercontinental Cup in 1984.

International career

With the Argentina national team he scored one goal against Romania in the 1990 World Cup.

Monzón became the first player to be sent off in a World Cup final, when referee Edgardo Codesal gave him a straight red card for a high tackle on Jürgen Klinsmann of Germany 65 minutes into the game, 20 minutes after he replaced fellow defender Oscar Ruggeri. Argentina lost the game 1–0. Many critics called the incident a prime example of Klinsmann's diving, a claim he contradicted. In an interview in 2004, Klinsmann noted that the foul left a 15-cm gash on his shin.

Managerial career

After retirement, Monzón became a coach and manager. He has coached different clubs in Mexico and Ecuador, as well as youth divisions of clubs in Mexico and Argentina. He had a short spell as interim manager of Independiente,.

In Ecuador, he was suspended for 2 months while coaching club Olmedo for aggression towards a referee.

He then became youth team manager at CD Veracruz before taking over as first team manager in the Primera División de México, he was replaced in 2007.

In 2008, he returned to Argentina to take over as manager of Chacarita Juniors.

Personal life
Monzón's son, Florián, is a professional footballer.

Career statistics

International goals
Scores and results list Argentina's goal tally first.

Honours

Player
 Independiente
Primera División Argentina: Metropolitano 1983, 1988–89
Copa Libertadores: 1984
Copa Intercontinental: 1984

References

External links
Yahoo Sports profile
 Biography
 Ecuatorian Suspension
 Argentine Primera statistics
 BDFA profile

1962 births
Living people
People from Goya
Argentine footballers
Argentine expatriate footballers
Club Atlético Huracán footballers
Club Atlético Independiente footballers
Barcelona S.C. footballers
Club Alianza Lima footballers
Atlético Tucumán footballers
Santiago Wanderers footballers
1990 FIFA World Cup players
1989 Copa América players
Argentina international footballers
Footballers at the 1988 Summer Olympics
Olympic footballers of Argentina
Argentine football managers
Club Atlético Independiente managers
Chacarita Juniors managers
C.D. Veracruz managers
Argentine Primera División players
Expatriate footballers in Chile
Expatriate footballers in Ecuador
Expatriate footballers in Peru
Argentine expatriate sportspeople in Chile
Argentine expatriate sportspeople in Ecuador
Argentine expatriate sportspeople in Peru
Association football defenders
Sportspeople from Corrientes Province
C.D. Olmedo managers